The Weston Hills Tunnel is a 230m twin road tunnel under the Weston Hills near Baldock in Hertfordshire.  It was constructed as part of the A505 Baldock bypass.

A public inquiry was held in 1995, and in 2002 the government granted permission to build the road. Construction started in April 2004 and the bypass and tunnels opened on 16 March 2006 

The bypass as a whole, including the tunnel, cost £43 million.

The tunnel itself was constructed using a cut and cover method, during which the hill was cut away and the concrete tunnel structure then put in place.  The hillside was then re-filled in over the top - see Bypass Construction Gallery.

The purpose of the tunnel at this position is to reduce the gradient of the road, and to preserve the visual line of the hills and provide crossing points for wildlife such as deer.  The chalk cuttings for the tunnel have become a haven for butterflies which are native to the area.

References

Transport in Hertfordshire
Road tunnels in England
Tunnels completed in 2006
Tunnels in Hertfordshire
Baldock